A revived language is one that, having experienced near or complete language extinction as either a spoken or written language, has been intentionally revived and has regained some of its former status.

The most frequent reason for extinction is the marginalisation of local languages within a wider dominant nation state, which might at times amount to outright political oppression. This process normally works alongside economic and cultural pressures for greater centralisation and assimilation. Once a language has become marginalised in this way, it is often perceived as being "useless" by its remaining speakers, who associate it with low social status and poverty, and consequently fail to pass it on to the next generation.

Aboriginal Australian languages
A great number of the original more than 250 Aboriginal Australian languages, which include around 800 dialects, have become extinct or nearly extinct since colonization. Since the late 20th century there have been efforts to revive many of these. The national project known as First Languages Australia has  supported 39 of these under its Priority Languages Support Project, commissioned by the Federal Government. This project supports other language projects around the country as a funding body.  The Mobile Language Team in South Australia lists 46 languages or dialects on its website , including Ngarrindjeri, Kaurna, Kokatha, Lower Arrernte and Pitjantjatjara, to name a few of the many languages on which it is working.

Some of the languages being revived across the country are:

Barngarla (Parnkalla, Banggarla), the language of the Barngarla people on the Eyre Peninsula, South Australia. It is being revived by Ghil'ad Zuckermann (University of Adelaide) and the Barngarla community, based on 170-year-old documents.
Diyari is spoken in the far north of South Australia, to the east of Kati Thanda (Lake Eyre). Studies and translations by German Lutheran missionaries in the late 19th and early 20th centuries created an extensive written form. By the early 21st century, only a few fluent speakers of Diyari remained. However, by 2013 Peter K. Austin had produced a dictionary and grammar of the language, and as of 2019, there is a project under way to teach it in schools.
Kaurna is the language of the Kaurna people of Adelaide and the Adelaide plains in South Australia. It is being revived by the Kaurna Warra Pintyanthi, a committee of Kaurna elders and youth, teachers, linguists and other researchers based at the University of Adelaide.
Palawa kani is an attempt to revive various Tasmanian dialects in a single combined form. The original Tasmanian languages, which may have numbered a dozen or more, became extinct in 1905 when the last native speaker died. As part of community efforts to retrieve as much of the original Tasmanian culture as possible, efforts are made to (re)construct a language for the Aboriginal Tasmanian community. Due to the scarcity of records, Palawa kani is being constructed as a composite of the estimated 6 to 12 original languages. Theresa Sainty and Jenny Longey were the first two "language workers" to work on the project in 1999.

Ainu

The Ainu language of the indigenous Ainu people of northern Japan is currently moribund, identified by Japanese scholars as a "dying language" since the 1920s. A 2006 survey of the Hokkaido Ainu indicated that only 4.6% of Ainu surveyed were able to converse in or "speak a little" Ainu. As of 2001, Ainu was not taught in any elementary or secondary schools in Japan, but was offered at numerous language centres and universities in Hokkaido, as well as at Tokyo's Chiba University. An Ainu language radio station was established in Hokkaido in 2001, and manga books have been produced in the language.

The work of researcher Kayano Shigeru has been prominent in the revival of Ainu, including the recording of the Ainu oral epics known as yukar. Shigeru also began the Nibutani Ainu Language School in 1983, the first Ainu school in Japan.

Cornish

Cornish was once spoken in the county of Cornwall until it became extinct as a spoken language in the late 18th century. The language had been in decline since the 14th century and by the time of the death of the last fluent speakers, was only spoken in the western fringes of the county. Dolly Pentreath (d. 1777) is believed to have been the last speaker of the language. Literature from the Medieval and Tudor periods, and fragments, including grammars, from the 17th, 18th and 19th centuries survived, which allowed Cornish to be reconstructed by a small group of Celtic enthusiasts in the 20th century as part of the Celtic Revival. These Cornish language revivalists borrowed heavily from Welsh and Breton in order to aid in the creation of the modern Cornish language. The reconstruction of the language was known for disputes over orthography during the late 20th century, until a Standard Written Form was agreed upon in 2008. The number of Cornish speakers is difficult to estimate, but it is believed that some 500 individuals have a degree of fluency in the language. The language is now taught in some schools in Cornwall. In 2010,  UNESCO reclassified the language from "extinct" to "critically endangered".

Dalmatian

The Dalmatian language was spoken in Dalmatia, a coastal region of Croatia, in the Middle Ages. Its last known native speaker was Antonio Tuone Udaina, who died on June 10, 1898, as the result of an explosion. The Dalmatian language is being revived by pro-autonomist Dalmatian activists, and today is estimated that there are about 20 fluent Dalmatian speakers and more than one hundred people with some knowledge of the language.

Hebrew

Hebrew was revived as a spoken language two millennia after it ceased to be spoken (although it was always used as a written language), and is considered a language revival "success story". Although used in liturgy,  and to a limited extent commerce,  it was extinct as a language used in everyday life until its revival. Hebrew was  considered impractically archaic or too sacred for day-to-day communication, although it was, in fact, used as an international language between Jews who had no other common tongue; several Hebrew-medium newspapers were in circulation around Europe at the beginning of the 19th century, and a number of Zionist conferences were conducted exclusively in Hebrew. Starting in the late 19th century,  it was revived as an everyday spoken language as part of the emerging Zionist movement. Eliezer Ben-Yehuda largely spearheaded the revival efforts, and his son Itamar Ben-Avi was raised as the first native Hebrew speaker since Hebrew's extinction as an everyday language. Hebrew is now the primary official language of Israel, and the most commonly spoken language there. It is spoken by over 9,000,000 people today. Most of them live in Israel or are Israeli expatriates, but many in Jewish communities outside Israel have undertaken its study.

Lazuri (Laz)

The UNESCO Atlas of the World's Languages in Danger (2010) declares Lazuri as a language that is definitively endangered. Lazuri is a Southwest Caucasian language spoken by ca. 30,000 people as their mother tongue along the East Black Sea coast of Turkey and in some parts of the Autonomous Republic of Adjara (Salminen, 2007).  The region where the Lazi people live is called Lazona (Benninghaus, 1989). Because Lazuri is primarily an oral language, and all new speakers tend to grow up bilingual (typically speaking Lazuri and Turkish), the language is at risk of extinction (e.g., Yuksel-Sokmen & Chasin, 2008). Although the Lazuri alphabet was first established around the late 20s by a native folklorist, named Iskender Tsitasi, who published periodicals and poems until 1938, there were many obstacles to learn and to teach Lazuri due to the lack of language learning resources and limited documentation of the language (interview with language activist İsmail Avcı Bucaklişi in Istanbul, April 2012). Hence, Lazuri remained a primary spoken language until Lazoglu and Feuerstein re-introduced the Lazuri Alboni or Alphabet in Latin letters in 1984 and started to publish periodicals, called 'Ogni' ("Did you hear"). The first Lazuri Dictionary (Bucaklişi & Uzunhasanoğlu, 2006) was among the first one to adopt the Lazuri Alboni. The Little Prince by Antoine de Saint-Exupery become the first book which has been formally translated into the Lazuri Alboni by Sinan Albayrakoğlu (2011) who worked four years on the Turkish to Lazuri translation. Also, in 2011 the Bosphorus University of Istanbul started to offer Lazuri as an elective class for beginners. With the recent establishment of the Lazika Yayin Kolektif (Lazika Publication Collective) in 2010, current and future generations of students, teachers, authors, and scholars of Lazuri are encouraged to contribute to the process of language revitalization, thus paving the way for a Lazuri literature.

Livonian

Livonian is a Finnic language spoken in Latvia.  It is one of the three languages (along with Manx and Cornish) listed as revived by the UNESCO Atlas of the World's Languages in Danger.

Leonese

Leonese was recognised as a seriously endangered language by UNESCO, in 2006. The only legal reference to this language is in the Autonomy Statute of Castile and León. The Province of León government supports the knowledge of this language through courses, by celebrating "Leonese Language Day" and by sponsoring literary efforts in the Leonese language, such as "Cuentos del Sil", where nine writers from teenagers to people in their eighties develop several stories in Leonese. The Leonese Local Government uses the Leonese language in some of their bureaus, organizes courses for adults and in 2007 organized Leonese Language Day. The Leonese Local Government official website uses the Leonese language. The Leonese language is taught in two schools of León city since February 2008. The local authority for education said it would be taught in all Leonese schools next course.

Manx

Manx is a language spoken in the Isle of Man, which is in the Irish Sea, between Scotland, England, Ireland and Wales. Manx ceased to function as a community language during the first quarter of the 20th century, but was revived by enthusiasts at a time when there were still a number of native speakers alive. Although at one point no native speakers of the language were alive and it may have been officially classified as "dead" in 1975, the revival appears to have gained strength in recent years. There is a regular programme in Manx on Manx Radio.

Mutsun

Mutsun is one of the eight Ohlone languages originally spoken in the San Juan Bautista, California area. The last fluent speaker, Ascencion Solórzano de Cervantes, died in 1930. The contemporary tribe,  tribal band, is working to revive the language using the notes of linguist John Peabody Harrington. The Mutsun language has a program to teach it to tribal members and a dictionary is being planned. The initial member to galvanize the language revitalization is Quirina Geary. Immersion into the language is planned in books, songs, and games Rumsen and Chochenyo are the other two Costanoan languages being revived along with Mutsun.

 Native American languages 
Some languages being revived across the Americas are:

Wampanoag: In the 21st century, Wampanoag became the first Native American language in the United States to be revived, with young children brought up in the language.

Chochenyo: The Muwekma Ohlone Tribe of California has revitalized the Chochenyo language, which was last spoken in the 1930s. As of 2009, many students were able to carry on conversations in Chochenyo.

Miami-Illinois/Irenwa: The Myaamia (Miami) Nation of Indiana still practice and use their native heritage to teach young and old so they can keep their traditional language alive. Many Miami members have described the language as "sleeping" rather than "extinct" since it was not irretrievably lost.

The revitalization effort is based on the work of linguist David Costa. Based on his extensive studies, he published The Miami-Illinois Language'' in 1994 as his Ph.D. dissertation and as a book in 2003. The book reconstructs the structure of Miami-Illinois.

The Myaamia Center is a joint venture between the tribe and Miami University. The Center seeks to "deepen Myaamia connections through research, education, and outreach." It is directed by Daryl Baldwin, who taught himself Miami from historic documents and studies held by the Smithsonian's National Anthropological Archives, and has developed educational programs. Baldwin's children were raised as native speakers of Miami. Center staff develop language and culture resources using material that is often from translated missionary documents.

Published language and culture resources include:

 a children's book of Miami language and culture;
 an audio CD set with vocabulary, phrases, conversation, and the Miami origin story and a companion text; and
 a compilation of traditional stories from the Miami and Peoria tribes, recorded in the early 20th century when the language's last native speakers were alive.

A related project at Miami University concerns ethnobotany, which "pairs Miami-language plant names with elders' descriptions of traditional plant-gathering techniques."

Nǁng language

Efforts are underway to revive the Nǀuu dialect

Occitan Gascon

The Aranese language, a standardized form of the Pyrenean Gascon variety of the Occitan language spoken in the Aran Valley, in northwestern Catalonia is still spoken. Once considered to be an endangered language, spoken mainly by older people, it is now experiencing a renaissance; it enjoys co-official status with Catalan and Castilian (Spanish) in Catalonia, and since 1984 has been taught in schools.

Sanskrit

Sanskrit was a pan-Indian language in Vedic times but lost its prominent place among spoken dialects in modern India. A number of attempts to revive Sanskrit have been made from the 18th century onward. However, it has been challenged in this role by various community languages, Hindi, Urdu and English.

Many of India's and Nepal's scientific and administrative terms are named in Sanskrit, as a counterpart of the western practice of naming scientific developments in Latin or Classical Greek. The Indian guided missile program that was commenced in 1983 by DRDO has named the five missiles (ballistic and others) that it has developed as Prithvi, Agni, Akash, Nag and Trishul. India's first modern fighter aircraft is named HAL Tejas.

Modern Sanskrit is spoken in around four villages in India. The Mattur village in central Karnataka, Shimoga district claims to have native speakers of Sanskrit among its population. Historically the village was given by King Krishnadevaraya of the Vijayanagara Empire to Vedic scholars and their families. People in his kingdom spoke Kannada and Telugu.

Samskrita Bharati is a non-profit organization working to revive Sanskrit, also termed Sanskrit revival.  The organization has its headquarters in New Delhi, and U.S. chapter headquarters in San Jose, California.  The Samskrita Bharati office in Bangalore is called "Aksharam" and houses a research wing, library, publication division, and audio-visual language lab for teaching spoken Sanskrit.

Soyot language

The language of the small-numbered Soyots in Buryatia, Russia, one of Siberian Turkic languages, has been reconstructed and a Soyot-Buryat-Russian dictionary has been published in 2002. The language is currently taught in some primary schools.

Yola

Yola, a sister language to English and Scots which became extinct in 1998 has undergone an attempted revitalization and revival movement. The “Gabble Ing Yola” resource center for Yola materials claims there are approximately 140 speakers of the Yola language today.

Wampanoag

In the 21st century, Wampanoag became the first Native American language in the United States to be revived, with young children brought up in the language.

See also
Language death
Language revitalization
Language policy
Minority language
Regional language

References 

Revived